Femmes aux yeux ouverts (Women with eyes open) is a Togolese documentary film directed by Anne-Laure Folly.  It covers the lives of contemporary African women in Burkina Faso, Mali, Senegal and Benin.

Production

The film was released in 1994 and runs for 52 minutes in French with English subtitles.
Folly said of it:

Description

This film records women from Benin, Burkina Faso, Mali, and Senegal discussing their lives.
The opening sequence of this film, Folly's second, has a young woman staring into the camera and reciting the poem:

The poem is recited by Monique Ilboudo of Burkina Faso, one of the women portrayed in the documentary.
The film lets different women from Mali, Senegal, Burkina Faso and Benin talk about how they deal with the issues they are facing. Seven sections cover the subjects of clitoridectomy, forced marriage, HIV/AIDS, struggle, survival, economics and politics. It shows the paradox in which women have great responsibility for the survival and welfare of their families, but are given little voice in major decisions.

Reception

The film won the Silver Medal at the 1994 Monte Carlo Television Festival. 
According to Kenneth W. Harrow, the film has a "rational substratum and structuring".
The film tries to communicate a universally valid value system for women.
Alice Walker said of the film:

References
Citations

Sources

External links
 

1994 films
Togolese films
1990s feminist films
Films set in Burkina Faso
Films set in Mali
Films set in Senegal
Films set in Benin
1994 documentary films